True Temper may refer to:

 True Temper, a lawn and garden tool manufacturer, now part of Ames True Temper
 True Temper Sports, a golf equipment manufacturer headquartered in Memphis, Tennessee
 True Temper Foursomes Tournament, a 1939 golf tournament sponsored by the company